The 2012–13 St. John's Red Storm men's basketball team represented St. John's University during the 2012–13 NCAA Division I men's basketball season. The team was coached by Steve Lavin in his third year at the school. St. John's home games were played at Carnesecca Arena and Madison Square Garden and the team was a member of the Big East Conference.

Off season

Departures

Class of 2012 signees

Transfer additions

Roster

Schedule

|-
!colspan=9 style=| Exhibition

  
|-
!colspan=9 style=| Non-Conference Regular Season

|-
!colspan=9 style=| Big East Conference Regular Season

|-
!colspan=9 style=| Big East tournament

|-
!colspan=9 style=| NIT

References

St. John's
St. John's Red Storm men's basketball seasons
St. John's
St John
St John